Dremel is a multinational brand of power tools, focusing on home improvement and hobby applications. Dremel is known primarily for its rotary tools such as the Dremel 3000, 4000 and 8200 series which are similar to the pneumatic die grinders used in the metalworking industry by tool or moldmakers. Dremel later expanded its product range and now produces butane tools, benchtop and hand-held saws and oscillating tools.

The Dremel die grinder tools were originally developed by Albert J. Dremel, an Austrian who founded the Dremel Company in 1932 in Racine, Wisconsin. The company was purchased by Robert Bosch GmbH in 1993, and today it is a division of the Robert Bosch Tool Corporation.

History 
Founded by the Austrian inventor Albert J. Dremel in 1932, the company is located in Racine, Wisconsin, US. Albert J. Dremel held 55 patents across a wide range of inventions. His first product released within the company was an electric razor-blade sharpener, which lost popularity when cheap disposable razors became available. Dremel then developed the high speed lightweight rotary tool, later named the Dremel Multitool, for which the company continues to be known. This invention was successful in the hobby and craft market.

In 1948, Dremel gave his employees a 3% year-end share of profits, at the time seen as a radical idea. Dremel died on 18 July 1968 at the age of 81.

People found many ways to use the rotary tools. In the 1940s the Defense Department reportedly used Dremel rotary tools in developing the first atomic bomb.  Military doctors used the tools in dermal abrasion techniques to reduce scar tissue from battle wounds. Dremel tools are also used in tattooing. It is also used by podorthists for use on shoe inserts, and dentists use them for crafting dentures.

Dremel said in 2013 that there were more than 17 million of their rotary tools in use.

Timeline 
 1932 – Albert J. Dremel founded the Dremel company. Awarded 55 patents; electric erasers, pusher lawn mower and first razor blade sharpener.
 1935 – Introduction of first handheld high-speed rotary tool, called the Moto-Tool.
 1939 – The Dremel Moto-Saw was developed.
 1964 – Introduction of the Dremel Electric Engraver.
 1973 – Introduction of compact table saw and multi-use disc/belt sander. Dremel Manufacturing Company was acquired by Emerson Electric
 1993 – The Dremel brand is purchased by Robert Bosch Tool Corporation.
 2003 – Dremel introduces the lithium-ion battery for power tools. New tool creation of the Dremel 10.8 Volt Lithium-Ion.

Operations
Dremel's US activities operate from Mt. Prospect, Illinois. Dremel's activities in Europe, the Middle East and Africa are operated by Dremel Europe, with its headquarter located in Breda, Netherlands.

Rotary tools 

The company currently produces six rotary tools, three corded and three cordless. Over its history, Dremel has created over 30 different designs and models, mainly for home improvement and hobby use. Dremel rotary tools are suitable for carving, engraving, routing, grinding, sharpening, cleaning, polishing, cutting and sanding. Many different accessories and attachments are also produced. Dremel Multitools work by using speed instead of torque. Different tools products range in speed from 3,000 to 37,000 RPM.

The concept of the original Dremel Moto-Tool was to rotate a bit held in a collet at high speed. Variable-speed versions cover a range of 3,000–37,000 RPM. The Dremel concept relies on high speed as opposed to the high torque of a conventional power drill. By inserting an appropriate bit (or burr) the tool can perform drilling, grinding, sharpening, cutting, cleaning, polishing, sanding, routing, carving, and engraving. Both battery-powered and corded models are available. Early cordless models were marketed as the Dremel Freewheeler.  Dremel options include a miniature planer attachment and a jigsaw attachment that lets the tool act much like a small reciprocating saw. Other Dremel rotary tools include a cordless pumpkin carving tool, a cordless pet nail grooming tool, and a cordless golf cleaning tool.

However, the collets are flexible and will accept both original Dremel and alternative makes of cutting, grinding, and polishing head shafts.

Other tools 
Dremel produces hot glue guns, scroll saws, butane tools, contour sanders, versatips, powered screwdrivers, as well as accessories and attachments. Dremel tools are categorised into Compact Tool Systems and Benchtop Tool Systems.

Dremel is also one of the manufacturers to release an oscillating tool in late 2008 after the patent had run out on Fein's Multimaster. Dremel's incarnation of this tool is called the Multi-Max.

Additionally, 3D printers are sold under the Dremel brand by 3Pi Tech Solutions

References

External links 

 
 "Dremel's Powerful New Moto-Tool", an article from the October 1967 issue of Popular Science
 Disassembly of a cordless Dremel tool

Power tool manufacturers
Metalworking cutting tools
Metalworking hand tools
Woodworking hand-held power tools
Tool manufacturing companies of the United States
Companies based in Mount Prospect, Illinois